The Rage and Rapture Tour was a co-headling concert tour by American new wave band Blondie and American rock band Garbage. It was launched in support of Blondie's eleventh studio album, Pollinator (2017), and Garbage's sixth studio album, Strange Little Birds (2016). The tour began on July 5, 2017, at the Mountain Winery in Saratoga, California. Support on the tour was provided by Sky Ferreira in Los Angeles, while John Doe and Exene Cervenka opened the first half of the tour, and Deap Vally opened the second leg.

Critical reception
Fred Schruers from Billboard described Deborah Harry, Shirley Manson and Sky Ferreria in the Los Angeles concert that "...all three epitomized a kind of sass and surety that indeed found a way to blend rage and rapture in a congenial package." Sarah Grant from Rolling Stone described Garbage's set in the New York City concert as "Social issues were the undercurrent of Garbage’s set. Manson dedicated 2001's "Cherry Lips" to the LGBTQ community, a thread continuing into "Sex Is Not the Enemy" and "Queer" wherein Manson's fulsome purr sounded like Michael Hutchence with strep throat."

Tour dates

Setlist

{{hidden
| headercss = background: #dddddd; font-size: 100%; width: 100%;
| contentcss = text-align: left; font-size: 100%; width: 100%;
| header = Blondie – Saratoga, CA (July 5, 2017)
| content =  
 "One Way or Another"
 "Hanging on the Telephone"
 "Fun"
 "Call Me"
 "My Monster"
 "In the Flesh"
 "Rapture"
 "Rainy Day Women #12 & 35"
 "Fragments"
 "Long Time"
 "Atomic"
 "Too Much"
 "Heart of Glass"
Encore
 "Maria"
 "Dreaming"
}}

References

External links
 Official Blondie website
 Official Garbage website

2017 concert tours
Blondie (band) concert tours
Co-headlining concert tours
Concert tours of Canada
Concert tours of Mexico
Concert tours of the United States
Garbage (band) concert tours